Air Warrior (AW) is a modular, integrated, rapidly reconfigurable combat aircrew ensemble designed for U.S. Army aircrews. Previous aviation life support equipment consisted of a non-integrated assemblage of protective and survival gear. AW uses a systems approach to equipping the aircrew and closes the capability gap between human and machine. Fielded incrementally in blocks to rapidly provide enhanced capabilities to the warfighter, AW leverages and integrates clothing and equipment, such as the Army Aircrew Combat Uniform and ballistic protection, from other product managers. As of April 2010, more than 18,000 AW systems had been fielded in support of Operation Iraqi Freedom and Operation Enduring Freedom.

Components

Electronic Data Manager
The Spiral 3.5 Electronic Data Manager (EDM) is a light, rugged, sunlight-readable touch-screen
computer operating on Windows-based software. The EDM is in the form of a kneeboard and
provides the aviator with an Aviation Mission Planning System interface, enhanced situational
awareness, GPS moving map capabilities, and enables the aircrew to quickly plan and safely
execute missions and react rapidly to mission changes in flight.  More than 2,200 Spiral 3.5 EDMS have been fielded.

Portable Helicopter Oxygen Delivery System
The Portable Helicopter Oxygen Delivery System (PHODS) is a lightweight breathing oxygen
product worn by the aircrew that provides supplemental oxygen to Soldiers without restricting
their movements in and around their aircraft. An automatic regulator dispenses oxygen via
nasal cannula in the correct amount and rate based upon altitude and the individual’s breathing
rate. It replaces the Helicopter Oxygen System, which weighed well over 100 pounds, tethered
the user to the aircraft, and could not be fitted on all Army rotary wing aircraft. Over 1,700
systems have been as of mid-2010.

Aircraft Wireless Intercom System
The Aircraft Wireless Intercom System (AWIS) provides hands-free, cordless communication between aircrew members. The system has a full duplex voice-activated mode, hands-free mode, and a push-to-talk mode. It features fifty independent channels (aircraft networks) with up to six crew members on each aircraft network. AWIS enables simultaneous omnidirectional communications among all users in the aircraft network within 200 feet of the center of the aircraft and provides the first true intercom capability between the entire aircraft crew, hoist operators, and rescue personnel on the hoist. Over 130 systems are fielded as of mid-2010 and an encryption capability will be added in Fiscal Year 2011.

History

Increment III 
AW Increment III includes:

Electronic Data Manager, a portable digital mission planning device for over-the-horizon messaging and enhanced situational awareness capabilities through connectivity to Blue Force Tracking-Aviation

Aircraft Wireless Intercom System for secure cordless, hands-free aircrew communications
Survival Kit, Ready Access, Modular (SKRAM) Go Bag with integrated hydration Portable Helicopter Oxygen Delivery System, a Soldier-worn supplemental breathing oxygen system for high-altitude operations
Communication Enhancement and Protection System (CEPS), provides helmet hear-through capability

Successor 
Building on the legacy Air Warrior gear carriage and clothing system, the Air Soldier (AS) Increment 1a initiative focuses on improving aircrew survivability, comfort, and efficiency by reducing weight and torso bulk, improving head and laser eye protection, and increasing rear crew member mobility.

The AS Increment 1a will feature optimized survival equipment (72-hour requirement) and a pocket system that eliminates unnecessary items. It also will include standardized survival gear components. It will reduce the bulk and weight of the legacy Air Warrior body armor system. As part of the AS Increment 1a, the Modular Aircrew Common Helmet (MACH) or an improved legacy HGU-56/P helmet will offer a 15 to 50 percent improvement in head impact protection. Advances in laser eye protection (from 3 to 5 fixed wavelengths) are also included in the initiative.

The Wearable Environmental Control System (WECS), powered by an Integrated Portable Power Source, will eliminate the cooling system umbilical for nonrated crew members. The AS Increment 1a will also feature enhanced SA/C3 capabilities to achieve JBC-P interoperability. Initial implementation of terrain/obstacle avoidance capability will be through the AW Electronic Data Manager.

Contract award for AS Increment 1a is expected in 2011.

Microclimate Cooling System
The Microclimate Cooling System (MCS) gives Army aircrews an increase of over 350 percent
(from 1.6 hours to 5.7 hours) mission endurance while wearing chemical protective equipment
or in other heat stress mission environments. The system features a vest and aircraft-mounted
cooling unit that pumps chilled water via an umbilical to small tubes embedded in the vest.
Because of its success as part of the Air Warrior ensemble, the MCS is also being used by crews
in ground vehicle platforms in Operation Iraqi Freedom, including Stryker, Abrams, and Bradley.

See also
 Land Warrior
 Future Force Warrior

Sources
This article incorporates work from https://web.archive.org/web/20110719162954/https://peosoldier.army.mil/newpeo/Folio2010/PMSW/PM_CSW/XM205.xml, which is in the public domain as it is a work of the United States Military.

United States Army equipment